Ryan Arnold (born September 18, 1984) is a Canadian pair skater. He competed with Carla Montgomery and Meagan Duhamel. In both partnerships, he was coached by Lee Barkell.

With Montgomery, Arnold qualified twice for the Junior Grand Prix Final and twice placed in the top ten at the World Junior Championships.

He teamed up with Meagan Duhamel in the spring of 2004. They were the first pair to land a side-by-side triple Lutz jump in competition, which they achieved at the 2005 Canadian Figure Skating Championships. At the 2005 World Junior Figure Skating Championships, they became the first team to land a throw triple Lutz jump in international competition.

Arnold also competed as a single skater on the national level and on the junior level internationally.

Programs

With Duhamel

With Montgomery

Competitive highlights

Pair skating with Duhamel

Singles career

Pair skating with Montgomery

References

External links 
 
 
 

Canadian male pair skaters
1984 births
Living people
People from Huntsville, Ontario
20th-century Canadian people
21st-century Canadian people